was the Governor of Hiroshima Prefecture from 1951 to 1962.

References

1894 births
1971 deaths
People from Hiroshima
Governors of Hiroshima